Auchenheath is a small village in South Lanarkshire, Scotland. It is on the River Nethan and is located near Blackwood, Kirkmuirhill, and Lanark.

Auchenheath House is a category B listed Italianate house. Originally built around 1842, it was extended and a chapel added later in the 19th Century.

References

See also
List of places in South Lanarkshire

Villages in South Lanarkshire